Roberta Dapunt (born 1970) is an Italian poet. Her 2018 collection of poetry, Sincope, won the Viareggio Prize.

Life and career

Dapunt was born in 1970 in Val Badia, Italy.

Her first collection of poetry, OscuraMente, was published in 1993 and this was followed with La carzzata mela in 1999. She published a collection of poetry with German translations called Nauz in 2012 which was republished in Italian as Il ponte del Sale in 2017. She also published La terra più del paradiso in 2013.

Her 2018 collection of poetry, Sincope won the Viareggio Prize for poetry.

She also released a music and poetry CD called del perdono in 2001.

References

1970 births
Living people
Italian women poets
Viareggio Prize winners